The Battle of Pratapgad was a battle fought on 10 November 1659, at the fort of Pratapgad,  Satara,  between the forces of the Marathas under Chhatrapati Shivaji and the  Bijapur troops under general Afzal Khan. The Marathas defeated the  Bijapuri forces. It was their first significant military victory against a major regional power.

Background
Shivaji raje held a commendable position in parts of Maval. The Adilshahi court wanted to curb his activities. Afzal Khan, a renowned general of Bijapur who had previously killed Shivaji raje's elder brother Sambhaji in a battle, was selected to lead an assault against Shivaji raje. He started from Bijapur in 1669. Shivaji raje met Afzal Khan on 10 November 1669 and killed him in a truce negotiation. Shivaji raje's forces then routed the scattered Adilshahi army.

Combat of Chhatrapati Shivaji and Afzal Khan

King Shivaji sent an envoy to Afzal Khan, stating that he did not want to fight and was ready for peace. A meeting was arranged between Shivaji raje and Afzal Khan at a shamiyana (highly decorated tent) at the foothills of Pratapgad. It was agreed that they would each bring only ten personal bodyguards with them. All the ten bodyguards would remain 'one arrow-shot' away from the pair. Shivaji raje chose Sambhaji Kondhalkar, Jiva Mahala, Siddi Ibrahim, Kataji Ingle, Kondaji Kank, Yesaji Kank, Krishnaji Gaikwad, Surji Katake, Visaji Murambak & Sambhaji Karvar for the meet. Afzal Khan hid a katyar (a small dagger) in his coat, and Shivaji raje wore armour underneath his clothes and carried a concealed weapon, wagh nakha in one hand.

As the two men entered the tent, the 6'7" tall Afzal Khan embraced Shivaji Maharaj, and next moment tried to strangle him in his vice-like grip and pierced his dagger in Shivaji raje. But the armour under Shivaji raje's clothes saved him. Shivaji raje retaliated by using his "wagh nakh" to slash Khan's stomach and disemboweled Khan. Thereupon, Afzal Khan's bodyguard Bada Sayyed attacked Shivaji raje with a sword but his personal bodyguard, Jiva Mahala, fatally struck him down. Also the lawyer of Afzal Khan, Krishna Bhaskar Kulkarni attacked Shivaji, in retaliation he killed Kulkarni with his sword.
Afzal Khan managed to hold his gushing entrails and hurtled, fainting and bleeding, outside the tent and threw himself into his palanquin. The bearers hastily lifted their charge and began moving rapidly away down the slope. Sambhaji Kavji Kondhalkar, Shivaji raje's lieutenant and one of the accompanying guards, gave chase and beheaded Afzal Khan.
The severed head was later sent to Rajgad to be shown to King Shivaji's mother, Jijabai. She had long wanted vengeance for the deliberate maltreatment of Shahaji raje Bhosale (Shivaji raje's father) while a captive of Afzal Khan, and for his role in the death of her elder son, Sambhaji Shahaji raje Bhosle. Shivaji sped up the slope towards the fortress and his lieutenants ordered cannons to be fired. It was a signal to his infantry, hidden in the densely forested valley, to raid the Adilshahi forces.

Hand-to-hand combat of the forces
Maratha troops commanded by Shivaji raje's captain Kanhoji Jedhe, swept down on Afzal Khan's 1,500 soldiers; resulting in a complete rout at the foothills of the fort. Then in a rapid march, a section of Adilshahi forces commanded by Musekhan was attacked. Musekhan, Afzal Khan's lieutenant, was wounded and subsequently fled the field.

Meanwhile, Moropant Pingle led the Maratha infantry toward the left flank of Adilshahi troops. The suddenness of this attack on Afzal Khan's artillery at close quarters made them ineffective in providing artillery cover for the main portion of their troops. And as a result of this the rest of their troops rapidly succumbed to an all out Maratha attack. Simultaneously Shivaji raje's Sardar (captain), Ragho Atre's cavalry units swooped down and attacked the large but unprepared Adilshahi cavalry before they were able to be fully geared up for battle and succeeded in completely routing them in short order.

The Maratha cavalry under Netaji Palkar pursued the retreating Adilshahi forces, who were attempting to join up with the part of their reserve forces stationed in the nearby village of Wai. They were engaged in battle before they could regroup and were defeated prior to reaching Wai. The Adilshahi forces not withstanding the onslaught of the Marathas started retreating towards Bijapur. The Maratha army chased the retreating army and on their way captured 23 Adilshahi forts.

See also

 List of Battles of Marthas 
 List of wars faught by Marath empire

Bibliography
 
 
 
 
 
Major Joshi Mukund – Battle of Pratapgarh – a new perspective
Commandant Kasar, D.B. – Rigveda to Raigarh making of Shivaji the great

References

1669 in India
Pratapgad 1669
Pratapgarh
Pratapgarh
Shivaji
Karnataka